Heinrich Sylvester Theodor Tiling (31 December 1818 in Wilkenhof, Livonia, now in Latvia – 6 December 1871 in Nevada City, California, US) was a German–Russian physician and naturalist. During his later years he became an American citizen.

Early years 
His parents were Johann Heinrich Tiling and Margarete, née Pearson of Balmadis. He studied medicine in Dorpat from 1838 to 1844. He graduated and received a doctor's degree in 1844.

Career 
Tiling became a physician at the "Russian North American Co." in Ayan, Siberia from 1845 through 1851. He went to Ayan over land with his young wife and arrived in winter 1845. The difficulties during the overland journey were extreme in parts. He published an account of it in  see below. The German title of the book translates as: "A journey around the world from West to East through Siberia and the Pacific and Atlantic seas". During his time in Ayan, he kept a daily register of the temperature and rainfall for Ayan. He described all plants in the area and published an account of it with the director of the botanical gardens in St. Petersburg, Russia, Eduard August von Regel (Florula Ajanensis; see below). He went back to Riga with his wife and four small children and arrived early 1852.

After that, he practiced medicine in Riga from 1853 to 1854. From 1854 to 1863, he practiced in Wenden and from 1863 until 1868, in Sitka, Alaska. He had settled in Sitka before the Alaska purchase. After it he stayed and later went on to San Francisco and Nevada City, California.

He collected and described numerous plants and species in Siberia, Alaska, and California from 1844 to 1871 such as Tiling's monkeyflower, Mimulus tilingii, native to North America.

Journey around the world
Directly after having got the doctor's degree, he was offered a post with the Russian-American Company to become the company surgeon in their newly created port on the Okhotsk Sea, Ayan. He married in the spring of 1844 Anna Elisabeth Fehrmann. She accompanied him on the overland journey to Siberia. Tiling started to learn the Russian language during his travels. The journey was slow and obviously lasted longer than planned and it was already winter when they arrived. After a lot of trouble that ended very nearly deadly, they arrived in Ayan on 4 December 1844 and Tiling began his work. At the time of his arrival, Ayan had only about 100 inhabitants and his duties as a doctor took up only about an hour per day. Thus Tiling could spend most of the day making scientific observations. One example is the temperature tables he made starting November 1847. He took temperatures three times per day, at 7 a.m., 2 p.m. and 9 pm, calculated monthly median values, and monthly high and low temperatures. He logged cloud cover, barometer readings, wind direction, and rainfall. He collected plants in the near vicinity of Ayan and according to his own conclusion "hardly missed one". His weather readings for Ayan are the oldest in Eastern Siberia. The flora of Ayan is one of the best documented in Siberia. In 1851, he and his family, now with four little children, took the boat from Ayan to Sachalin, Kamschatka, Sitka, Hawaii, Tahiti, around Cape Horn through the Atlantic Ocean back to Kronstadt.

Back in Europe
After the arrival in Europe, Tiling practised first in Riga. In 1854 he was the county surgeon for Wenden. Only when he moved to America he left this post.

Second journey
From 1863 to 1868, Tiling was surgeon in Sitka, Alaska. This was either again with the Russian-American Company, or with the Russian Government represented through the governor. Whether his wife and family accompanied him on this second journey is not entirely clear, yet it is very likely. She herself died in Riga in 1876, and also much later all their eight children. So nobody of the family stayed in the end in North America. At the time of the journey their youngest child Eduard was only six years old. Therefore, it can be assumed that at least his wife and some of the children came with him. In 1867 the US government purchased Alaska from Russia, yet Tiling stayed in Sitka. Most of the higher ranking Russian officials moved back to Europe. It is very likely that Tiling spoke English, his mother being English. His wife Anna was born in London and should have some degree of knowledge of the English language as well.

There is no detailed written evidence about the later movements to San Francisco and Nevada City.

Critical assessment 
Very obviously the collection and categorization of plants is core to Tiling's personality. This passion is with him throughout his life. From his various places of residence he send back plants, specimens, seeds, and descriptions. Lange and Gumprecht, the two persons that reviewed ,  sing his praise for the introduction and popularisation of the pretty garden shrub Weigela Middendorfiana to Europe's gardens. In addition to that Regel wrote: "It is mainly Dr. Tiling to whom we owe the introduction of many excellent Siberian plants"  The review of Lange and Gumprecht go far above a normal book review. They add information about Tilings voyage that is not contained in the book they review. The size of the review with 21 full pages is remarkable as well. Although  was published anonymously the reviewers did know the author and supported his views. There must have been intensive contact between author and reviewers previously. Specifically intensive was Tilings exchange with the director of the Botanical Gardens in St Petersburg, Eduard August von Regel with whom he published Florula Ajanensis.

Trained as a medical man and having the collection of plants at his heart his interests far exceeded these two areas. One example is the meteorological observations in Ayan described above. This is probably the earliest systematic weather observations taken in Eastern Siberia. Through the scientifically trained experience of different geographical areas of the world and their resulting flora and fauna Tiling developed a very modern view of the development of nature. At the beginning of his lecture "On the inhabitants of the seas", which he gave after his return from Ayan, he made people aware of the differences in the various parts of the sea and the reason for it. The Baltic Sea, on whose shore he and his audience was born and raised, he thought as very poor in diversity of species. Today that is an acknowledged fact. As the most widely known example for the extinction of species he names Steller's sea cow "… We have seen not very long ago the extinction of an animal of the sea and that in a part of the sea that seemed so vast to us that we thought it should give shelter for its harassed inhabitants."

The large variety of species and individuals in the Sea of Okhotsk near his former home Ayan was described very lively. He combined this knowledge with what he had seen on his return voyage to Europe 1851–1852 as ship's surgeon from Ayan via Sakhalin, Kamchatka, Sitka, Hawaii, Tahiti, around the Cape Horn and through the Atlantic Ocean back to the baltic seaport Kronstadt, now a suburb of St. Petersburg. He drew the following conclusion: "… Add the huge numbers of sea lions, sea bears and walrusses, which you may encounter in various parts of the sea and you will have to confess that it is due to the complete annihilation of these creatures in the Baltic Sea to which we owe the deadly calmness that the view of the sea induces in us. We have so to speak only the splendid frame left of the gigantic picture that our creator has set before our eyes."  With this he formulates an indeed very modern view and concern that scientists formulated distinctly during the last twenty years.

Plants named by him 
More than 20 species were named after him. The abbreviation Tiling indicates that Heinrich Sylvester Theodor Tiling has described this species for the first time.

Brassicaceae
Arabis tilingii (Regel) Berkut.
Borodinia tilingii (Regel) Berkut.
Braya tilingii Regel
Hesperis tilingii Kuntze
Sisymbrium tilingii E.Fourn.
Smelowskia tilingii (Regel) Vorosch.
Caryophyllaceae
Silene ajanensis (Regel & Tiling) Vorosch.
Sofianthe ajanensis (Regel & Tiling) Tzvelev
Stellaria sibirica (Regel & Tiling) Schischk.
Compositae / Asteraceae
Erigeron tilingii Vorosch.
Hieracium tilingii Üksip
Convallariaceae
Streptopus tilingii (Regel) Grey
Streptopus ajanensis Tiling ex Maxim.
Gentianaceae
Swertia perennis L. subsp. stenopetala (Regel & Tiling) Vorosch.
Swertia stenopetala (Regel & Tiling) Pissjaukova
Leguminosae / Fabaceae
Oxytropis tilingii Bunge
Spiesia tilingii Kuntze
Ranunculaceae
Pulsatilla ajanensis Regel & Tiling
Thalictrum aquilegiifolium L. var. sibiricum Regel & Tiling
Trollius ochotensis Tiling
Rosaceae
Padus avium Mill. var. pubescens (Regel & Tiling) T.C.Ku & B.M.Barthol.
Potentilla fragiformis Willd. var. villosa (Pall. ex Pursh) Regel & Tiling
Potentilla nivea L. var. villosa (Pall. ex Pursh) Regel & Tiling
Sieversia selinifolia Fisch. ex Regel & Tiling
Sorbaria kirilowi (Regel & Tiling) Maxim.
Spiraea kirilowii Regel & Tiling
Saxifragaceae
Saxifraga tilingiana Regel & Tiling
Umbelliferae / Apiaceae
Tilingia Regel & Tiling
Tilingia ajanensis Regel & Tiling

Further reading

References

Sources

External links 
 https://web.archive.org/web/20080610191305/http://gdz.sub.uni-goettingen.de/dms/load/img/

19th-century botanists from the Russian Empire
People of Russian America
1818 births
1871 deaths
Botanists active in California
Physicians from Alaska
Physicians from California
People from Livonia
People from Nevada City, California
People from Sitka, Alaska
19th-century American physicians
19th-century German physicians
19th-century German botanists
19th-century American botanists